Junonia pacoma, the Pacific mangrove buckeye, is a species in the butterfly family Nymphalidae described in 2020. It is found primarily in western Mexico.

References

Further reading

 

Junonia